Papilio paeon is a species of swallowtail butterfly from the genus Papilio that is found in Ecuador, Peru, Bolivia, Costa Rica, Venezuela and Colombia.

Biology
A bioindicator of integrity in semi-arid vegetation and habitats.

Subspecies
Papilio paeon paeon (Ecuador, Peru, Bolivia)
Papilio paeon thrason C. & R. Felder, 1865 (Costa Rica, Venezuela, Colombia)
Papilio paeon escomeli Cockerell, 1927 (Peru)

References

External links

Butterfly corner Images from Naturhistorisches Museum Wien

paeon
Butterflies described in 1836
Papilionidae of South America
Taxa named by Jean Baptiste Boisduval